Dan or Danny Johnson may refer to:

Politics
 Dan Johnson (Kansas politician) (1936–2014), member of Kansas House of Representatives
 Dan Johnson (Kentucky politician) (1960–2017), member of Kentucky House of Representatives
 Dan G. Johnson, member of Idaho Senate

Sports
 Dan Johnson (American football) (born 1960), American football tight end
 Dan Johnson (baseball) (born 1979), baseball player
 Danny Johnson (footballer) (born 1993), English footballer for Mansfield Town F.C.
 Danny Johnson (ice hockey) (1944–1993), Canadian ice hockey player
 Danny Johnson (American football) (born 1995), American football cornerback

Other
 Dan Johnson (economist) (born 1969), Canadian economist
 Dan Johnson (journalist) (born c. 1984), English journalist and presenter
 Dan Johnson (musician), American rock drummer
 D. E. Johnson or Dan E. Johnson, American author
 Dan Curtis Johnson, American programmer and comic book writer

See also
 Daniel Johnson (disambiguation)
 Daniel Johnston (disambiguation)